There are a number of places, both bays and communities, in the world known as West Bay.

Canada
 West Bay (Newfoundland and Labrador)
 West Bay, Nova Scotia (disambiguation)
United Kingdom
 West Bay, Dorset, formerly known as Bridport Harbour, approximately two miles from Bridport on the Jurassic Coast in Dorset, England.
United States
 West Bay (Michigan), an arm of Grand Traverse Bay.
 West Bay (Texas), a bay in Texas separated from the Gulf of Mexico by Galveston Island.
Qatar
 West Bay (Doha), a bay in the capital, Doha, in which the West Bay Lagoon is located, and the name of an area in the capital.
Cayman Islands
 West Bay, Cayman Islands is a town on Grand Cayman.
Antarctica
 West Bay (Fallieres Coast), a small bay within Marguerite Bay, Fallieres Coast.
 West Bay (Heard Island), a small bay on the west coast of Heard Island.

See also
 East Bay (disambiguation)
 North Bay (disambiguation)
 Sai Wan
 South Bay (disambiguation)